Juan Arricio (born 11 December 1923, date of death unknown) was a Bolivian football midfielder who played for Bolivia in the 1950 FIFA World Cup. He also played for Ayacucho La Paz. Arricio is deceased.

References

1923 births
Year of death missing
Bolivian footballers
Bolivia international footballers
Association football midfielders
1950 FIFA World Cup players